The 1967 Cork Senior Football Championship was the 79th staging of the Cork Senior Football Championship since its establishment by the Cork County Board in 1887. The draw for the opening round fixtures took place on 29 January 1967. The championship began on 23 April 1967 and ended on 29 October 1967.

St. Nicholas' entered the championship as the defending champions, however, they were beaten by University College Cork in the first round.

On 29 October 1967, Beara won the championship following a 2-05 to 0-07 defeat of University College Cork in a final replay. It was their fifth championship title overall and their first title since 1940.

Eric Philpott and Con O'Sullivan were the championship's joint top scorers.

Team changes

To Championship

Promoted from the Cork Intermediate Football Championship
 Na Piarsaigh

From Championship

Regraded to the Cork Intermediate Football Championship
 Millstreet

Results

First round

Quarter-finals

Semi-finals

Final

Championship statistics

Top scorers

Top scorers overall

In a single game

References

Cork Senior Football Championship